Batavia Football Club is an Indonesian football club based in South Jakarta, Jakarta. They currently compete in Liga 3 and their homebase is Soemantri Brodjonegoro Stadium.

Players

Current squad

Honours
 Liga 3 Jakarta
 Champion: 2021

References

External links
 

South Jakarta
Football clubs in Jakarta
Football clubs in Indonesia
Association football clubs established in 2010
2010 establishments in Indonesia